Elspeth Somerville Sandys  (born 1940) is a New Zealand author and script writer.

Background  

Born in Timaru in 1940, she grew up in Dunedin. She was adopted by the Alley family and was exposed to literature from a young age by Rewi Alley. She uses the surname Sandys as a pseudonym.

Sandys received an MA (First Class Honours) in English from the University of Auckland, an Associate Diploma (FTCL) in Speech & Drama and a Fellowship Diploma (LTCL) in Music, both from Trinity College London.

Works 
Sandys's fiction often focuses on personal, social, and political relationships. While some of her novels are historical fiction their motivating themes remain contemporary. In addition to her published works, Sandys has taught creative writing and worked as an editor at Oxford University Press.

Novels 
 Obsession (Upstart Press, 2017)
 A Passing Guest (Flamino, 2002)
 Enemy Territory (Hodder Moa Beckett, 1997)
 Riding to Jerusalem (in New Zealand: Hodder Moa-Beckett, 1997, and in the UK: Hodder & Stoughton,1997 )
 River Lines (in New Zealand: Hodder Moa-Beckett, 1995, and in the UK: Hodder & Stoughton, 1995)
 Finding Out (Vintage, 1991), also published in French as Découvertes (Actes Sud, 1997)
 Love and War (William Collins, 1982)
 The Broken Tree (Hutchinson, 1981), published in the United States under the title The Burning Dawn (Dell, 1981)
 Catch a Falling Star (Blond and Briggs, 1978)

Short story collections 
 Standing in Line (published in English and Spanish, in Mexico by the Secretariat of Culture, 2005)
 Best Friends (David Ling, 1993)

Poetry 
Sandys has had poems and short fiction published in several journals including in: Landfall (multiple pieces including short story 'The Postman', 2012);  PEN (UK); New Zealand Listener; and New Zealand Books Pukapuka Aotearoa.

Non-fiction 
 What Lies Beneath: a memoir (Otago University Press, 2014)
 Casting Off: a memoir (Otago University Press, 2017)
 A Communist in the Family: Searching for Rewi Alley (Otago University Press, 2019)
With John Man, Sandys has ghostwritten several non-fiction works including The Survival of Jan Little (Penguin Books, 1986).

Sandys has written for both the BBC and Radio New Zealand including original plays and adaptations, and scripts for film and television, with performances taking place in the United Kingdom and New Zealand.

Honours and awards 
Her novel, River Lines, was longlisted for the 1996 Orange Prize and her unpublished collection of short stories, Standing in Line, won the Elena Garro Prize in 2003.

In 2005, her play Vagabonds (previously titled Masquerade) was selected for the International Playwriting Festival in London. It was also shortlisted in 2006 in the Columbus State Theatre Playwriting Competition.

In the 2006 New Year Honours, Sandys was appointed an Officer of the New Zealand Order of Merit, for services to literature.

Residencies and fellowships 
In 1992 Sandys was awarded the Grimshaw Sargeson Fellowship with Gaelyn Gordon. She was awarded the Robert Burns Fellowship, in 1995, a literary residency at the University of Otago in Dunedin, New Zealand. In 2016 she received a residency at the Michael King Writers’ Centre.

References

External links 
 Official homepage

Living people
New Zealand fiction writers
New Zealand women novelists
New Zealand women short story writers
Officers of the New Zealand Order of Merit
University of Auckland alumni
Alumni of Trinity College of Music
People from Timaru
1940 births